Tongzhou Beiguan is a station on Line 6 of the Beijing Subway. The station opened on December 28, 2014.

This station is located in Tongzhou District, Beijing.

Station Layout 
The station has an underground island platform.

Exits 
There are 4 exits, lettered A, B, C, and D. Exit A is accessible.

References

External links

Beijing Subway stations in Tongzhou District
Railway stations in China opened in 2014